Curt Magnus Wilhelm Andstén (September 12, 1881 – June 1, 1926) was a Finnish sailor who competed in the 1912 Summer Olympics. He was a crew member of the Finnish boat Örn, which finished fourth in the 8 metre class competition.

References

External links
 list of Finnish sailors

1881 births
1926 deaths
Finnish male sailors (sport)
Sailors at the 1912 Summer Olympics – 8 Metre
Olympic sailors of Finland
20th-century Finnish people